The men's 1500 metres event at the 2017 European Athletics U23 Championships was held in Bydgoszcz, Poland, at Zdzisław Krzyszkowiak Stadium on 13 and 15 July.

Medalists

Results

Heats

14 July

Qualification rule: First 4 (Q) and the next 4 fastest (q) qualified for the final.

Final
15 July

References

1500 metres
1500 metres at the European Athletics U23 Championships